Errol Earl Brown (born 16 June 1952, St Catherine, Jamaica) is a former Jamaican cricketer who played first-class cricket from 1978 to 1985. He toured India and Sri Lanka in 1978-79 with the West Indian team but did not play Test cricket.

Brown made his first-class debut for Jamaica in the 1977-78 season, playing five games and taking 15 wickets at an average of 33.00 with his off-spin, with a best analysis of 6 for 62 in the victory over Trinidad.

When most of the senior West Indian cricketers were playing World Series Cricket in Australia in the 1978-79 season, Brown was one of several inexperienced players to be selected for the tour of India. He played in eight of the first-class matches, but took only eight wickets. He played a few matches for Jamaica later that season, and two more in 1984-85, but with little success.

References

External links
 Errol Brown at Cricket Archive
 Errol Brown at Cricinfo

1952 births
Living people
People from Saint Catherine Parish
Jamaican cricketers
Jamaica cricketers